"Jumping" is the fifth Japanese single released by Korean boy group The Boss. It was released on March 28, 2012 on their Japanese label Sony Music Entertainment.

Single information
Diverting from songs such as those in their "Love Series", the group embarks on a "2nd Stage" with the upcoming release of "Jumping", taking on a more mature look and feel through the concept pictures as well as the full song. The new single's title track was described as a mellow, light rock and dance tune. It will be available for ringtone download starting March 7, after which the full song will be available to download starting March 21. The music video for the new single was already revealed through the Japanese YouTube channel of Sony Records, but is currently only available for Japanese residents.

The single was released in three different versions, including a regular edition, limited edition A and limited edition B. The regular edition includes "Jumping" and its instrumental, as well as its B-sides "Someday" and "Promise". Limited edition A comes with the same CD, as well as a DVD which has the music video for the title track and the making of. Limited edition B has an extra DVD including live footage of one of the "Love Letters" events. First press regular edition releases are filled with trading cards, one out of six in each release.

Track list

CD

Limited edition A DVD

Limited edition B DVD

Charts

Release history

References

External links
 大国男児 | Sony Music 
 The Boss official website 

2012 singles
J-pop songs
2012 songs
Sony Music Entertainment Japan singles